Treasure Island is a 1982 Soviet children's adventure film based on Robert Louis Stevenson's 1883 novel. Directed by Vladimir Vorobyov, it stars Fyodor Stukov and Oleg Borisov.

Cast

References

External links
 

Soviet adventure films
1980s children's adventure films
1982 films
Russian children's adventure films
Treasure Island films
1980s Russian-language films